Liu Yingbao (born 4 September 1988) is a Chinese former short track speed skater. He is a world champion of the World Team Championships.

Liu's World Cup podium was second place in the 500 m race at the 2002-03 World Cup stage in Chuncheon. He also won two team relays and once finished second in relay during the 2002-03 season. He participated only once at the World Championships: in 2002, he finished 6th at 500 m, 9th at 1500 m, 10th at 1000 m, and was 11th in the overall classification.

External links
 Liu's profile
 List of Chinese short track speed skaters

Living people
Chinese male short track speed skaters
Asian Games medalists in short track speed skating
Short track speed skaters at the 2003 Asian Winter Games
Medalists at the 2003 Asian Winter Games
Asian Games silver medalists for China
21st-century Chinese people
1988 births